The women's heptathlon event at the 2004 World Junior Championships in Athletics was held in Grosseto, Italy, at Stadio Olimpico Carlo Zecchini on 16 and 17 July.

Medalists

Results

Final
16/17 July

Participation
According to an unofficial count, 16 athletes from 13 countries participated in the event.

References

Heptathlon
Combined events at the World Athletics U20 Championships